Beaver County Christian High School is a private non-denominational Christian high school in Beaver Falls, Pennsylvania established in 1969. Beaver County Christian is accredited by Christian Schools International. Their athletic teams compete as the BCCS Eagles in the Western Pennsylvania Interscholastic Athletic League.

References

External links
School website

Private high schools in Pennsylvania
Schools in Beaver County, Pennsylvania